Mirrors is a 1978 American horror film directed by Noel Black and starring Kitty Winn, Peter Donat, William Swetland, and Mary-Robin Redd. The film concentrates on a woman bedevilled by dark forces and voodoo magic, and has a tagline "There are some fools still living who don't believe in voodoo...but not for long!"

Background
The film marks Black's attempt to return to the big screen. The film was initially titled Marianne and went through several rounds of editorial meddling and script changes, and remained unreleased for six years. Kitty Winn also played a supporting role in Exorcist II: The Heretic.

Plot
A newlywed couple stay at an old small hotel in New Orleans. Soon the wife starts seeing strange visions in which she is sought by a sombre group of people for some dark purpose. When people around her start unexpectedly dying, she realizes that her dreams are real—as the hotel staff proceed to put an ancient voodoo priestess' curse on her. A mysterious doctor attempts to help her, but the couple has their suspicions about him also.

Cast

Kitty Winn as Marianne Whitman
Peter Donat as Dr. Philip Godard
William Swetland as Charbonnet
Mary-Robin Redd as Helene
William Paul Burns as Gary Whitman
Lou Wagner as Chet
Don Keefer as Peter
Barbara Coleman as Art Tour Guide
Becki Davis as Betty

References

External links

1978 films
American horror films
Films directed by Noel Black
1970s English-language films
1970s American films